Andalusi Arabic, also known as Andalusian Arabic, was a variety or varieties of Arabic spoken mainly from the 9th to the 17th century in Al-Andalus, the regions of the Iberian Peninsula (modern Spain and Portugal) once under Muslim rule. It became an extinct language in Iberia after the expulsion of the former Hispanic Muslims, which took place over a century after the Granada War by the Catholic Monarchs of Spain. Once widely spoken in Iberia, the expulsions and persecutions of Arabic speakers caused an abrupt end to the language's use on the peninsula. Its use continued to some degree in North Africa after the expulsion, although Andalusi speakers were rapidly assimilated by the Maghrebi communities to which they fled.

Origin and history
The Muslim forces that conquered Iberia in 711, about a century after the death of prophet Muhammad, were composed of a small group of Arabic speakers and a majority of Amazigh people, of whom many spoke little or no Arabic. According to Consuelo López-Morillas, "this population sowed the seeds of what was to grow into an indigenous Andalusi Arabic."

Unlike the Visigothic conquest of Iberia, through which Latin remained the dominant language, the Islamic conquest brought a language that was a "vehicle for a higher culture, a literate and literary civilization." Arabic became the dominant medium of literary and intellectual expression in the southern half of the peninsula from the 8th century to the 13th century.

Andalusi Arabic appears to have spread rapidly and been in general oral use in most parts of Al-Andalus between the 9th and 15th centuries.  The number of speakers is estimated to have peaked at around 5–7 million speakers around the 11th and 12th centuries before dwindling as a consequence of the Reconquista, the gradual but relentless takeover by the Christians. The colloquial Arabic of al-Andalus was prominent among the varieties of Arabic of its time in its use for literary purposes, especially in zajal poetry and proverbs and aphorisms.

In 1502, the Muslims of Granada were forced to choose between conversion and exile; those who converted became known as the Moriscos. In 1526, this requirement was extended to Muslims in the rest of Spain, the Mudéjars. In 1567, Philip II of Spain issued a royal decree in Spain forbidding Moriscos from the use of Arabic on all occasions, formal and informal, speaking and writing. Using Arabic henceforth would be regarded as a crime. Arabic speakers were given three years to learn a "Christian" language, after which they would have to get rid of all Arabic written material. This triggered one of the largest revolts, the Rebellion of the Alpujarras (1568–1571). Still, Andalusi Arabic remained in use in certain areas of Spain (particularly the inner regions of Valencia and Aragon) until the final expulsion of the Moriscos at the beginning of the 17th century.

As in every other Arabic-speaking land, native speakers of Andalusi Arabic were diglossic, that is, they spoke their local dialect in all low-register situations, but only Classical Arabic was resorted to when a high register was required and for written purposes as well. Andalusi Arabic belongs to the pre-Hilalian dialects of the Maghrebi Arabic family, with its closest relative being Moroccan Arabic. Like other Maghrebi Arabic dialects, Andalusi does not differentiate between sedentary and Bedouin varieties. By contrast, Andalusi does not show any detectable difference between religious communities, such as Muslim Muladís, Christian Mozarabs, and Jews, unlike in North Africa where Judeo-Arabic dialects were common.

The oldest evidence of Andalusi Arabic utterances can be dated from the 10th and 11th century, in isolated quotes, both in prose and stanzaic Classical Andalusi poems (muwashshahat), and then, from the 11th century on, in stanzaic dialectal poems (zajal) and dialectal proverb collections, while its last documents are a few business records and one letter written at the beginning of the 17th century in Valencia. Andalusi Arabic is still used in Andalusi classical music and has significantly influenced the dialects of such towns as Sfax in Tunisia, Tétouan and Tangier in Morocco, Nedroma, Tlemcen, Blida, and Cherchell in Algeria, and Alexandria in Egypt. Andalusi Arabic also influenced Mozarabic, Spanish (particularly Andalusian), Ladino, Catalan-Valencian-Balearic, Portuguese, Classical Arabic and Moroccan, Tunisian, Egyptian, Hassani and Algerian Arabics.

Features of Andalusi Arabic 
Many features of Andalusi Arabic have been reconstructed by Arabists using Hispano-Arabic texts (such as the azjāl of ibn Quzman, al-Shushtari and others) composed in Arabic with varying degrees of deviation from classical norms, augmented by further information from the manner in which the Arabic script was used to transliterate Romance words. The first complete linguistic description of Andalusi Arabic was given by the Spanish Arabist Federico Corriente, who drew on the Appendix Probi, zajal poetry, proverbs and aphorisms, the work of the 16th century lexicographer Pedro de Alcalá, and Andalusi letters found in the Cairo Geniza.

Phonology 

The phoneme represented by the letter ق in texts is a point of contention. The letter, which in Classical Arabic represented either a voiceless pharyngealized velar stop or a voiceless uvular stop, most likely represented some kind of post-alveolar affricate or velar plosive in Andalusi Arabic. Federico Corriente presents the case that ق most often represented , sometimes , and marginally  based on a plethora of surviving Andalusi writings and Romance transcriptions of Andalusi Arabic words.

Contact with native Romance speakers led to the introduction of the phonemes ,  and, possibly, the affricate  from loanwords.

However,  could turn into  or  via imāla.

Syntax and morphology

Passive voice 
Andalusi Arabic is uniquely conservative among colloquial Arabic dialects for retaining the passive voice ( 'sighatu l-majhul') of Standard Arabic verbs, using the same stem of the active voice verb with different vocalization. The passive voice is expressed in the past or perfect tense with kasra (/i/) on the last syllable and damma (/u/) on all other syllables, and in the imperfect tense with damma /u/ on the personal subject prefix—the first syllable—and fatḥah /a/ on the following syllables.

The  which, in Classical Arabic, marked a noun as indefinite accusative case (see nunation), became an indeclinable conjunctive particle, as in ibn Quzmān's expression .

The unconjugated prepositive negative particle  developed out of the classical verb .

The derivational morphology of the verbal system was substantially altered. One example is the initial n- on verbs in the first person singular, a feature shared by many Maghrebi varieties.

An example drawn from Ibn Quzmān will illustrate this:

See also 

 Varieties of Arabic
 Maghrebi Arabic
Siculo-Arabic
 Aljamiado
 Mozarabic language

References

Bibliography 
 
 
 

Medieval languages
Arabic languages
Extinct languages of Spain
Culture of Al-Andalus
Languages attested from the 9th century
Languages extinct in the 17th century